Azima is a genus of plants in the family Salvadoraceae.

Species include
Azima angustifolia
Azima sarmentosa
Azima tetracantha

References

Salvadoraceae
Brassicales genera
Taxonomy articles created by Polbot